Schofield Hall is the main administrative building of the University of Wisconsin-Eau Claire. It houses a variety of different administrative offices, including the university's admissions office. It is located on Garfield Avenue, directly across from the UW-Eau Claire footbridge that links the Water Street side of campus to lower campus. The building is named after Harvey Schofield, the first President of what was then called Eau Claire State Normal School. It was added to the National Register of Historic Places for its educational significance in 1983.

References

School buildings completed in 1915
School buildings on the National Register of Historic Places in Wisconsin
Buildings and structures in Eau Claire, Wisconsin
University of Wisconsin–Eau Claire
National Register of Historic Places in Eau Claire County, Wisconsin
1915 establishments in Wisconsin